"The Moment You Believe" is a song by British singer-songwriter, Melanie C. It was released in 2007 as the first single in Europe from her fourth album This Time. Produced and co-written by Peter Vettese, it has been soundbed for the spring advertising campaign for German TV show Nur die Liebe zählt. The song became a hit in some parts of Europe, reaching number one in Spain and the top 20 in Germany, Sweden and Switzerland.

Music video

The video for the song premiered on 23 February 2007 on VIVA in Europe. It was directed by Tim Royes at 17 February 2007 and shot at Ealing Studios the day after the "I Want Candy" video shoot. It was captured in one long shot on a steadicam. A total of six takes were filmed, and the final product is the result of looking over those six and picking the best one.

Formats and track listings
Switzerland two track CD single
 "The Moment You Believe" – 3:29
 "Fragile" – 4:05

Europe CD maxi single
 "The Moment You Believe" – 3:29
 "Fragile" – 4:05
 "The Moment You Believe"  – 4:59
 "The Moment You Believe"  – 3:29
 "The Moment You Believe"  – 3:29

Charts

Weekly charts

Year-end charts

Release history

References

External links
Official site

2007 singles
Number-one singles in Spain
Melanie C songs
Pop ballads
Songs written by Melanie C
Songs written by Peter-John Vettese
Music videos directed by Tim Royes
2006 songs
2000s ballads
Baroque pop songs
Song recordings produced by Peter-John Vettese